Ramona Portwich (born 5 January 1967 in Rostock) is an East German-German sprint canoer and marathon canoeist who competed from the late 1980s to the late 1990s. Competing in three Summer Olympics, she won five medals with three golds (K-2 500 m: 1992, K-4 500 m: 1998, 1996) and two silvers (K-2 500 m: 1992, K-4 500 m: 1996).

Portwich also won sixteen medals at the ICF Canoe Sprint World Championships with thirteen golds (K-2 500 m: 1990, 1991, 1995; K-2 5000 m: 1989, 1990, 1991, 1993; K-4 500 m: 1987, 1990, 1991, 1993, 1994, 1995), two silvers (K-4 200 m: 1994, 1995), and a bronze (K-2 500 m: 1993).

References
 DatabaseOlympics.com profile

External links
 
 

1967 births
Canoeists at the 1988 Summer Olympics
Canoeists at the 1992 Summer Olympics
Canoeists at the 1996 Summer Olympics
East German female canoeists
Living people
Olympic canoeists of East Germany
Olympic canoeists of Germany
Olympic gold medalists for East Germany
Olympic gold medalists for Germany
Olympic silver medalists for Germany
Sportspeople from Rostock
Olympic medalists in canoeing
ICF Canoe Sprint World Championships medalists in kayak
Medalists at the 1996 Summer Olympics
Medalists at the 1992 Summer Olympics
Medalists at the 1988 Summer Olympics